In the run up to the 2018 general election of 9 September 2018 in Sweden, various organisations carried out opinion polling to gauge voting intentions. Results of such polls are displayed in this article.

The date range for these opinion polls are from the previous general election, held on 14 September 2014, to the present day.

List of political parties in Sweden shows the abbreviations used here.

Graphical summary

Poll results

Parties
Poll results are listed in the table below in reverse chronological order, showing the most recent first, and using the date the survey's fieldwork was done, as opposed to the date of publication. If such date is unknown, the date of publication is given instead. The highest percentage figure in each polling survey is displayed in bold, and the background shaded in the leading party's colour. In the instance that there is a tie, then no figure is shaded. The lead column on the right shows the percentage-point difference between the two parties with the highest figures. When a specific poll does not show a data figure for a party, the party's cell corresponding to that poll is shown empty.

See also the projected results by coalition below.

Coalitions
The figures under "Above threshold" disregard votes for parties that would not get enough votes (4%) to be represented in parliament.

See also

Opinion polling for the 2014 Swedish general election
Opinion polling for the 2022 Swedish general election

2018
2018 Swedish general election